Pempelia genistella, the gorse colonial hard shoot moth, is a moth of the family Pyralidae. It is native to south-western Europe and north-western Africa, but has been introduced as a biological control agent for gorse in New Zealand and Hawaii.

The wingspan is 26–29 mm. Adults are on wing in July in western Europe.

The larvae feed on the needles of Ulex europaeus in which they spin a dense, conspicuous silken communal web.

References

External links
UKmoths
Status as Biological Control Agent in New Zealand
Fauna Europaea

Moths described in 1836
Phycitini
Moths of Europe
Moths of New Zealand